"God Moves in a Mysterious Way" is a Christian hymn, written in 1773 by William Cowper from England. It was written by Cowper in 1773 as a poem entitled "Light Shining out of Darkness".

The poem was the last hymn text that Cowper wrote. It was written following his attempted suicide while living at Olney in Buckinghamshire. John Newton published the poem the next year in his Twenty-six Letters on Religious Subjects; to which are added Hymns (1774).

Words
The words were composed by William Cowper (1731–1800). Constituting six verses, they were written in 1773, just before the onset of a depressive illness, during which Cowper attempted suicide by drowning. The text was first published by Cowper's friend, John Newton, in his Twenty-six Letters on Religious Subjects; to which are added Hymns in 1774. The hymn was later published in Olney Hymns which Cowper co-wrote with Newton. Entitled Conflict: Light Shining out of Darkness, it was accompanied by a text from Saint John's Gospel, Chapter 13: Verse 7, which quotes Jesus saying to his disciples; "What I do thou knowest not now; but thou shalt know hereafter."

The first line of the hymn has become a proverb in modern times, usually phrased as "God moves in mysterious ways" or "the Lord moves in mysterious ways."

Music

The hymn tune London New comes from The Psalmes of David in Prose and Meeter of 1635. In Common Praise, it is in D major.

A popular alternative and rather similar tune is Dundee, which comes from the Scottish Psalter of 1615; the harmony was arranged by Thomas Ravenscroft (1592–1635) in 1621.

Other traditional tunes include:
Manoah, first published by Henry Wellington Greatorex in Boston, Massachusetts in 1843 but sometimes attributed to Joseph Haydn, and Irish by Charles Wesley, first published in 1749.
St. Anne, by Chapel Royal composer William Croft (1708)
Union, from Select Number of Plain Tunes, by Andrew Law (1781).

Much of the hymn became the lyrics of the theme song for the award-winning 2017 Danish television series Ride upon the Storm.

Inclusion in other works
 Variation (4) on Old Psalm Tunes, Book 1, George Dyson
 Saint Nicolas by Benjamin Britten (1948 cantata) – the final movement IX, The Death of Nicolas
 Joy Beyond the Sorrow: Indelible Grace VI, a 2012 album by Nashville, Tennessee based artist collective, Indelible Grace
 "Pity and Shame", a short story by Ursula K. Le Guin published in Tin House, June 7, 2018. https://tinhouse.com/pity-and-shame/

References

External links

Audio clips
 St Nicholas – IX movement by Benjamin Britten

Video clips
 St Nicolas IX movement

1773 songs
1773 poems
English Christian hymns
Poetry by William Cowper
18th-century hymns